Indian Slough is a slough, tributary to the Old River, an old channel of the San Joaquin River in California.

References 

Rivers of California
Sacramento–San Joaquin River Delta
Tributaries of the San Joaquin River
Rivers of Contra Costa County, California